Dendrobium chrysotoxum (golden-bow dendrobium or fried-egg orchid) is a widely cultivated species of orchid. It is native to Southeast Asia, growing naturally in Myanmar, Bhutan, Yunnan, China, Manipur, Assam, India, Bangladesh, Andaman Islands, Laos, Nepal, Thailand, and Vietnam.

References 

 Aldén, B., S. Ryman & M. Hjertson (2009) "Gulddendrobium" Våra kulturväxters namn - ursprung och användning Formas, Stockholm (Handbook on Swedish cultivated and utility plants, their names and origin).

External links

chrysotoxum
Flora of Indo-China
Flora of the Indian subcontinent
Orchids of Yunnan
Plants described in 1847